In epidemiology, information bias refers to bias arising from measurement error. Information bias is also referred to as observational bias and misclassification. A Dictionary of Epidemiology, sponsored by the International Epidemiological Association, defines this as the following:

"1. A flaw in measuring exposure, covariate, or outcome variables that results in different quality (accuracy) of information between comparison groups. The occurrence of information biases may not be independent of the occurrence of selection biases.

2. Bias in an estimate arising from measurement errors."

Misclassification
Misclassification thus refers to measurement error. There are two types of misclassification in epidemiological research: non-differential misclassification and differential misclassification.

Nondifferential misclassification
Nondifferential misclassification is when all classes, groups, or categories of a variable (whether exposure, outcome, or covariate) have the same error rate or probability of being misclassified for all study subjects. It has traditionally been assumed that in the case of binary or dichotomous variables nondifferential misclassification would result in an 'underestimation' of the hypothesized relationship between exposure and outcome. However, this has more recently been challenged in that results of individual studies represent a single estimate and not the average of repeated measurements and thus can be farther (or nearer) from the null value (i.e. zero) than the true value.

Differential misclassification
Differential misclassification occurs when the error rate or probability of being misclassified differs across groups of study subjects. For example, the accuracy of blood pressure measurement may be lower for heavier than for lighter study subjects, or a study of elderly persons may find that reports from elderly persons with dementia are less reliable than those without dementia. The effect(s) of such misclassification can vary from an overestimation to an underestimation of the true value. Statisticians have developed methods to adjust for this type of bias, which may assist somewhat in compensating for this problem when known and when it is quantifiable.

References

Further reading

Bias